Cuapetes agag is a species of shrimp found in New Caledonia, Melanesia, Queensland, and the Red Sea. It was first named by Kemp in 1922.

References

External links

Palaemonoidea
Crustaceans described in 1922